Jwala Daku is a 1981 Bollywood Hindi action film, directed by R.P. Swamy and produced by Swaran Singh. The film was released on 14 April 1981 under the banner of Swarn Films.

Plot
Ravi, a medical student, has come back to his village after the completion of his studies in Bombay. He would like to start a practice there but Ravi discovers that his family is in total chaos. A dreaded dacoit named Jwala Daku is hounding Ravi's brother Bankey in a personal vendetta. Now Ravi has to either face the dacoit or return to Bombay.

Cast
 Ranjeet as Jwala's brother
 Salma Agha as Singer
 Asha Sachdev as Bijli
 Lalita Pawar as Bijli's aunt
 Farida Jalal as Sita
 Mohan Choti as villager
 Narendra Nath as Mangal
 Urmila Bhatt
 Shashi Puri as Ravi
 Sudhir Dalvi as Rahim
 Sudhir as Bankey
 Raju Shrestha as Raja
 Rehana Sultan as Ramva bai
 Birbal as Pyarelal
 Mahendra Sandhu as Jwala

References

External links

1981 films
Indian action films
1980s Hindi-language films
Films about outlaws
Indian films about revenge
1981 action films